Paolo V. Tamburello is a politician in Montreal, Quebec, Canada. He served on the Montreal city council from 1994 to 2005 and was a member of the Montreal executive committee under Pierre Bourque.

City councillor
Tamburello was a travel agent before entering political life. He was a co-ordinator for Mayor Jean Doré's Montreal Citizens' Movement (MCM) in the Saint-Michel in the early 1990s, before leaving the party over its failure to close the Miron quarry urban landfill site. In the 1994 municipal election, he was elected to council for the Saint-Michel division as a member of Pierre Bourque's Vision Montreal (VM). Bourque's party won a majority on council, and Tamburello initially served as backbench supporter of the administration.

Tamburello supported Bourque during Vision Montreal's 1997 inter-party crisis and was named as an associate member of the executive committee on February 5, 1997. Later in the same month, he was appointed to the city's environment committee. He was re-elected in the 1998 election and was promoted to full executive committee membership on November 12, 1998, with responsibility for parks, gardens, and greenspace. In late 1999, he announced that Montreal would provide one million dollars in services to the Mosaiculture International Montreal 2000's horticultural event.

Tamburello was re-elected to council in the 2001 municipal election, in which Vision Montreal was defeated by Gérald Tremblay's Montreal Island Citizens Union (MICU). Following the election, he left the executive committee and served as an opposition member. By virtue of holding his council seat, he also received a position on the newly formed Villeray—Saint-Michel—Parc-Extension borough council, and was chosen as its first chair. In 2003, his designation was upgraded to borough mayor.

In late December 2004, Tamburello left Vision Montreal to sit as an independent. He joined MICU on March 2, 2005. He sought re-election as borough mayor of Villeray—Saint-Michel—Parc-Extension in the 2005 municipal election, but was defeated by Vision Montreal's Anie Samson.

Tamburello remained active with Tremblay's party (renamed as Union Montreal) after the 2005 election. In 2007, he was elected to the party's executive as a vice-president representing the city's eastern region.

In 2009, the Montreal Gazette reported that Tamburello and city councillor Marcel Tremblay, the mayor's brother, "were reported to have spoken on behalf of" developer Michael Rosenberg, a contributor to Union Montreal, to Canadian prime minister's press secretary Dimitri Soudas. Tamburello and Tremblay said that they were not seeking to intervene on behalf of Rosenberg, but were curious about the status of a file involving the developer. Soudas was investigated by the federal ethics commissioner for his handling of the matter and "was cleared of wrongdoing in June 2008."

Provincial politics
Tamburello ran for the Action démocratique du Québec (ADQ) party in the 2003 provincial election.

Electoral record

References

Living people
Montreal city councillors
Action démocratique du Québec candidates in Quebec provincial elections
Year of birth missing (living people)